Andrea Gardini (born 1 October 1965) is an Italian professional volleyball coach and former player, a silver (Atlanta 1996) and bronze (Sydney 2000) Olympic Games medallist, three–time World Champion (1990, 1994, 1998), and four–time European Champion (1989, 1993, 1995, 1999). Gardini was inducted into the Volleyball Hall of Fame in 2007. He currently serves as head coach for the Polish PlusLiga team, PGE Skra Bełchatów.

Personal life
His son, Davide (born 1999) is also a volleyball player.

Career

As a coach
In 2011, he became an assistant coach of Andrea Anastasi in the Polish national volleyball team. On 10 July 2011, they led Poland to a bronze medal of the 2011 World League, the nation's first ever World League medal. On 18 September 2011, Poland, led by Anastasi and Gardini, won a bronze medal at the 2011 European Championship. In the same year, their team won a silver medal at the 2011 World Cup and qualified for the Olympic Games London 2012. For the first time in its history, the Polish national team won three medals in one year. On 8 July 2012, Poland won the final match of the 2012 World League against United States (3–0). In October 2013, Anastasi and Gardini were dismissed as coaches of the Polish national team.

On 22 December 2014, he was appointed new head coach of Indykpol AZS Olsztyn. In May 2015, he signed a new contract with the club from Olsztyn.

Honours

As a player
 CEV European Champions Cup
  1991/1992 – with Messaggero Ravenna
  1992/1993 – with Messaggero Ravenna
  1994/1995 – with Sisley Treviso
  1998/1999 – with Sisley Treviso

 FIVB Club World Championship
  São Paulo 1991 – with Messaggero Ravenna

 CEV Cup
  1986/1987 – with Tartarini Bologna
  1993/1994 – with Sisley Treviso

 CEV Challenge Cup
  1997/1998 – with Sisley Treviso
  1999/2000 – with Piaggio Roma

 National championships
 1990/1991  Italian Cup, with Messaggero Ravenna
 1990/1991  Italian Championship, with Messaggero Ravenna
 1993/1994  Italian Championship, with Sisley Treviso
 1995/1996  Italian Championship, with Sisley Treviso
 1997/1998  Italian Championship, with Sisley Treviso
 1998/1999  Italian SuperCup, with Sisley Treviso
 1998/1999  Italian Championship, with Sisley Treviso
 1999/2000  Italian Championship, with Piaggio Roma
 2001/2002  Italian Championship, with Casa Modena Salumi

As a coach
 National championships
 2018/2019  Polish Cup, with ZAKSA Kędzierzyn-Koźle
 2018/2019  Polish Championship, with ZAKSA Kędzierzyn-Koźle
 2020/2021  Polish Championship, with Jastrzębski Węgiel
 2021/2022  Polish SuperCup, with Jastrzębski Węgiel

Individual awards
 1988: Olympic Games – Best Spiker
 1989: FIVB World Cup – Best Spiker
 1990: FIVB World League – Best Blocker

State awards
 2000:  Knight of the Order of Merit of the Italian Republic

References

External links

 
 
 Player profile at Volleyhall.org
 Coach/Player profile at Volleybox.net
 Player profile at LegaVolley.it   
 Coach profile at LegaVolley.it 
 
 
 

1965 births
Living people
Sportspeople from the Province of Ravenna
Italian men's volleyball players
Knights of the Order of Merit of the Italian Republic
Italian volleyball coaches
Volleyball coaches of international teams
Olympic volleyball players of Italy
Olympic medalists in volleyball
Olympic silver medalists for Italy
Olympic bronze medalists for Italy
Volleyball players at the 1988 Summer Olympics
Volleyball players at the 1992 Summer Olympics
Volleyball players at the 1996 Summer Olympics
Volleyball players at the 2000 Summer Olympics
Medalists at the 1996 Summer Olympics
Medalists at the 2000 Summer Olympics
Competitors at the 1990 Goodwill Games
Goodwill Games medalists in volleyball
Italian expatriate sportspeople in Poland
AZS Olsztyn coaches
ZAKSA Kędzierzyn-Koźle coaches
Jastrzębski Węgiel coaches
Skra Bełchatów coaches